HMS Winchester was a 60-gun fourth rate ship of the line of the English Royal Navy, launched at Bursledon on 11 April 1693.

In 1695, Winchester foundered on Carysfort Reef in the Florida Keys and was lost.

Notes

References

Lavery, Brian (2003) The Ship of the Line - Volume 1: The development of the battlefleet 1650-1850. Conway Maritime Press. .

Ships of the line of the Royal Navy
1690s ships
Ships built on the River Hamble